Arg or ARG may refer to:

Places
Arg means "citadel" in Persian, and may refer to:
Arg, Iran, a village in Fars Province, Iran
Arg (Kabul), presidential palace in Kabul, Afghanistan
Arg, South Khorasan, a village in South Khorasan Province, Iran
Arg of Karim Khan
Arg of Tabriz
Arg-é Bam, an ancient citadel in Bam, Iran
Arg-e Rayen, Kerman, Iran
Herat Citadel, also known as Arg-e Herat
ARG, the ISO 3166-1 alpha-3 country code for Argentina

People
James Argent, nicknamed "Arg"

Arts, entertainment, and media
Alternate reality game
American Record Guide, a classical music magazine
Archive for Reformation History, journal

Mathematics
Argument (complex analysis), the angular component of a complex number or function
Argument of a function, a specific input in a mathematical function

Military
ARG, US Navy hull classification symbol for "internal combustion engine repair ship"
Amphibious ready group of US Navy

Organizations and enterprises
Aerolíneas Argentinas (ICAO: ARG)
American Research Group, US polling research firm
Architectural Resources Group, a firm based in San Francisco, US
Architectural Research Group, Philadelphia, US, 1932–35
Austin Rover Group, 1980s UK carmaker

Transportation
ARG Argentina Línea Privada, 2001–02, at other times airline LAPA (Líneas Aéreas Privadas Argentinas)
Arisaig railway station, UK, National Rail code
Australian Railroad Group

Other uses
Antigua Recreation Ground, the national stadium of Antigua and Barbuda
Former Argentine gold and silver pesos, ISO 4217 code
Arginine, an α-amino acid abbreviated as Arg or R
Aragonese language, ISO 639 alpha-3 code arg